David Pilbeam (born 21 November 1940 in Brighton, Sussex, England) is the Henry Ford II Professor of the Social Sciences at Harvard University and curator of paleoanthropology at the Peabody Museum of Archaeology and Ethnology.  He is a member of the National Academy of Sciences.  He received his Ph.D. from Yale University.

Biography
Pilbeam has produced numerous publications related to hominoid evolution since the mid-1960s, with some of his papers reprinted in later books.

In the 1970s, he was a co-discoverer, in the Potwar Plateau of Pakistan, of a nearly complete skull subsequently described as belonging to Sivapithecus indicus, an extinct Late Miocene great ape, on which he published several papers.

In 2005, in honour of his 65th birthday, Pilbeams' students, colleagues, collaborators and friends assembled a collection to honour his work. Pilbeam himself later contributed to a paper honouring Ofer Bar-Yosef.

In the summer of 2007, Pilbeam was appointed interim dean of Harvard College. He oversaw the continuing process of redesigning the undergraduate curriculum, as well as a large increase in financial aid to students and the planning of a housing renewal project. Pilbeam's decision to end reimbursement of social events which provide alcohol was largely unpopular among students.

Pilbeam describes himself as "interested in a wide range of topics involving human and primate evolution".  Among his most recent activities has been working with Michel Brunet and colleagues on the description and analysis of the new hominin from Chad, Sahelanthropus tchadensis.  He describes his long-term and continuing interests as including "the behavioral reconstruction and phylogenetic relationships of Miocene apes, which broadens to include more theoretical aspects of phylogenetics", and "the analysis of faunal change and its relationship to environmental change" particularly based on an extensive faunal record from the Neogene Siwalik Series of Pakistan.  He also describes himself as having recently become interested in evolutionary developmental biology, and particularly in the development and evolution of the anthropoid axial skeleton.

Honors
 International Prize (Fyssen Foundation), 1986
 Docteur Honoris Causa, Université de Poitiers, 2002
 Foreign Associate, National Academy of Sciences, 1992–1997
 Member, National Academy of Sciences (following naturalization), 1997–
 Fellow, American Academy of Arts and Sciences

Publications
<div class="references">

Papers
David Pilbeam has written and contributed to numerous papers, the bulk of which are listed below:

a.  (see 1987 reprint)

c. 

d. 

e. 

f. 

g. 

h. 

i. 

j. 

k. 

l. 

m.  PDF fulltext Supporting Tables

n.

Books
Pilbeam also authored, co-authored, edited and contributed to (e.g. in forewords) books, with some key publications below.

o.  (Reprint of 1968 article in Nature).

 Book review

References

External links
 David Pilbeam's Home page

Living people
Harvard University faculty
Members of the United States National Academy of Sciences
Yale University alumni
1940 births